Saksid is a village near Dornberk in the Vipava Valley in western Slovenia in the Municipality of Nova Gorica.

References

External links
 
Saksid on Geopedia

Populated places in the City Municipality of Nova Gorica